Texis is the fifth studio album by American noise pop duo Sleigh Bells.

Track listing
All tracks written by Alexis Krauss and Derek E. Miller.

References

2021 albums
Sleigh Bells (band) albums